Leño is the first studio album by Spanish hard rock band Leño. It was produced by Teddy Bautista and published by Chapa Discos in 1979.

During the recording, bassist Chiqui Mariscal left the band and was replaced by Tony Urbano as shown at the cover of the album.

It was ranked as the 106th best rock en español album ever according to American magazine Al Borde. The Spanish magazine Efe Eme ranked Leño as the 72nd best Spanish rock album ever.

Track listing

Personnel 
Leño
 Rosendo Mercado: guitar, lead vocals
 Chiqui Mariscal: bass (all but 3), backing vocals
 Tony Urbano: bass (3), backing vocals
 Ramiro Penas: drums, backing vocals
Additional personnel
 Teddy Bautista: harmonica, keyboards

References

External links 
 http://www.rosendo.es/

1979 debut albums
Spanish-language albums